Dolná Strehová is a village and municipality in the Veľký Krtíš District of the Banská Bystrica Region of southern Slovakia.

Etymology
The name comes from Slavic strъg-, strěg-: to watch, to guard. 1245 de villa Stregowa, 1250 Stregoa, 1310 de Strigua, 1349 poss. Stregoua, 1393 Ztregua, 1461 Stregwa, 1487 Ztrehowa, 1808 sk. Dolnj Střehowá, hu. Asló-Sztregova and sk. Hornj Střehowá, hu. Felső-Sztregova.

History
The village belonged to many feudatory families. In 1534 it passed to Léva town (today Levice, Slovakia). In the 18th century it belonged to the Esterházy family. In 1920, by the Treaty of Trianon, it became part of the newly formed Czechsolovakia. In 1938, by the First Vienna Award, it was returned to Hungary until the end of World War II, when it became part of Czechsolovakia again. Since 1993, it is part of Slovakia.

Genealogical resources

The records for genealogical research are available at the state archive "Statny Archiv in Banska Bystrica, Slovakia"

 Roman Catholic church records (births/marriages/deaths): 1811-1899 (parish A)
 Lutheran church records (births/marriages/deaths): 1815-1897 (parish A)

See also
 List of municipalities and towns in Slovakia

References

External links
 
 
https://web.archive.org/web/20080111223415/http://www.statistics.sk/mosmis/eng/run.html
http://www.e-obce.sk/obec/dolna-strehova/dolna-strehova.html
Surnames of living people in Dolna Strehova

Villages and municipalities in Veľký Krtíš District